Cody Alan Slate (born August 14, 1987) is a former American football tight end. He previously played for the Kansas City Chiefs. He played college football at Marshall University. He attended Hargrave Military Academy. Slate was considered one of the top tight ends in the nation and a top prospect at the tight end for the 2010 NFL Draft, but was undrafted, after suffering from a torn ACL. Slate was projected as a legitimate All-American candidate for the 2009 season after he led the Thundering Herd in catches during the last two years and earned All Conference USA Honors.

References

External links
Marshall Thundering Herd Bio
Kansas City Chiefs Bio

1987 births
Living people
People from Chipley, Florida
American football tight ends
Marshall Thundering Herd football players
Kansas City Chiefs players